Erica manipuliflora is a plant belonging to the genus Erica. The plant is native to Albania, Bosnia and Herzegovina, Croatia, Cyprus, East Thrace, Greece, Italy, Lebanon, Montenegro, North Macedonia, Serbia, Slovenia, Turkey and Syria.

References 

manipuliflora